Hurricane Virgil was a late season hurricane of the 1992 Pacific hurricane season that struck southwestern Mexico in October 1992. Forming from a tropical wave that left Africa on September 13, it slowly developed into a tropical depression. It soon strengthened into Tropical Storm Virgil, and rapidly intensified into a hurricane on October 2. Continuing to intensify, the hurricane attained major hurricane strength, and peaked as a Category 4 hurricane off the coast of Mexico. Shortly before landfall, it weakened to a Category 2 hurricane, and it dissipated on October 5. Damage was generally minimal, though one person was reported missing.

Meteorological history

Virgil originated from a tropical wave that moved off the coast of Africa on September 13, 1992, beginning a westward course through the Atlantic and Caribbean without much development, although there was an increase convection near the Lesser Antilles on the September 20. However, this was disorganized and suppressed by an upper-level trough during the wave's passage through the Caribbean Sea. The wave crossed over Panama on September 25, and convection began to increase when it reached the Eastern Pacific, although it  was initially disorganized. The system later became better organized, and on October 1, the wave organized into a tropical depression. Shortly thereafter, it was upgraded to a tropical storm and was named Virgil.

Upon becoming a tropical storm, the system was expect to move near the coast of Mexico, and forecasters noted that there was some potential for a landfall.  The system became a little better organized and over warm water and low wind shear Virgil steadily intensified. Virgil was upgraded to a hurricane the next day; an eye formed an hour later. During the period of strengthening, Virgil turned more towards the north. Continued strengthening occurred, and it attained major hurricane status on October 2. At this time, the system was anticipated to make landfall in Mexico as a Category 4 hurricane. The storm had maximum winds of 130 mph (215 km/h), but shortly thereafter the storm began to weaken.

By 0900 UTC October 2, the eye started to become less defined. Based on this, the storm was downgraded into a category 3 hurricane. Although an eye was no longer visible on satellite imagery, the storms had displayed very deep convection, thus the NHC initially maintained the intensity at 120 mph (195 km/h). Virgil's eye continued to become less defined, and was downgraded to Category 2 intensity at the time of first landfall on October 4 in Michoacan midway between Manzanillo and Lazaro Cardenas.. After briefly tracking over Manzanillo Bay, the hurricane moved onshore Colima as a Category 1 hurrican. It rapidly weakened over land, and was a dissipating tropical depression by the time it moved offshore.

Preparations and Impact
Prior to the arrival of the hurricane, several watches and warnings were issued. During the afternoon of October 2, a hurricane watch was first issued for areas west of Zinhuantatenjo. The next day, the watch was upgraded into a hurricane warning. Fifteen hours later the area east of Zinhuantatenjo, a tropical storm warning was issued. The watches were gradually dropped over the next few days, and by October 4.

Due to the sparsely populated area it struck, only minor damage was reported. Heavy rain and flooding were reported, peaking at over 10 inches (25 cm) in one location. One person was reported missing in the state of Colima, and three people were injured in Guerrero. More than 1,000 homes were damaged in Guerrero, Michoacán, and Colima, as was 7,400 acres (30 km2) of farmland. A flood on the Atoyac River washed away 500 homes in Guerrero, which prompted the evacuation of 2,500 people. A passenger train north of Lázaro Cárdenas, Michoacán, was derailed when it encountered washed-out roadbeds. The storm also caused power outages.

See also

Other storms of the same name
Pacific hurricane
List of Pacific hurricanes
List of Category 4 Pacific hurricanes

References

1992 Pacific hurricane season
Category 4 Pacific hurricanes
Hurricanes in Guerrero
Hurricanes in Michoacán
Hurricanes in Colima